Les Femmes de ma vie is the 11th French studio album by Joe Dassin. It came out in 1978 on CBS Disques.

Track listing

References

External links 
 

1978 albums
Joe Dassin albums
CBS Disques albums
Albums produced by Jacques Plait